Pierre Salama (2 January 1917 – 2 April 2009) was a French historian and archaeologist, specialist of Roman roads in Africa as well as milestones. An epigrapher, numismatist, he was also a specialist of historical geography.

Publications 
1948: Le réseau routier de l'Afrique romaine, Comptes rendus de l'Académie des inscriptions et belles-lettres,  (online) ;
1949: Carte du réseau routier de l'Afrique romaine; nouv. éd. 2010 (Bibliothèque de l'Antiquité tardive, 17)   ;
1951: Les voies romaines de l'Afrique du Nord
1987: Bornes milliaires d'Afrique proconsulaire
2000: Le Sahara pendant l'Antiquité classique, Gamal Mokhtar [under the dir. of], Histoire générale de l'Afrique, vol. II « L'Afrique ancienne », éd. Présence Africaine/Edicef/Unesco,  ;
2005: Numerous articles including 22 reprinted in Promenades d'antiquités africaines : scripta varia with Jean-Pierre Laporte

External links 
 Pierre Salama (1917-2009) on data.bnf.fr

20th-century French historians
French archaeologists
French epigraphers
1917 births
People from Algiers
2009 deaths
20th-century archaeologists